DAWN is the third studio album released by Aimer under Defstar Records label. It was released in three versions: a limited CD+Blu-ray (Type-A), a limited CD+DVD edition (Type-B), and a regular CD only edition. The album reached #4 rank first week in Oricon rankings. It charted 26 weeks and totally sold more than 39,000 copies.

Track listing

Charts

Album

Singles

Sales

Awards and nominations

References

External links
  (Aimer-web)
  (agehasprings)
  (Sony Music Entertainment Japan)
 DAWN on quia
 234 DAWN on Arata Kato Photography
 
 
 
 DAWN on VGMdb

Aimer albums
2015 albums
Japanese-language albums
Defstar Records albums